Black Coffee is the second album by American singer and musician Ann Savoy, released in 2010. It is credited to Ann Savoy & Her Sleepless Knights.

Reception

Allmusic critic William Ruhlman recalled similarities to Quintette du Hot Club de France with Django Reinhardt and Stéphane Grappelli, calling the album "quite pleasant, if in a distinctly retro manner."

Track listing 
"I Cried for You" (Gus Arnheim, Arthur Freed, Abe Lyman) – 3:35
"Whoa Tilly, Take Your Time" (Stuart Balcom, Henry Creamer, John Henry, Turner Layton, Bessie Smith, C. Smith) – 3:03
"Nuages" (Django Reinhardt) – 2:56
"Black Coffee" (Al Goodhart, Al Hoffman, Maurice Sigler) – 3:56
"If It Ain't Love" (Fats Waller, Andy Razaf, Don Redman) – 3:30
"You've Been a Good Ole Wagon" (Stuart Balcom, John Henry, Bessie Smith, C. Smith) – 2:45
"My Funny Valentine" (Richard Rodgers, Lorenz Hart) – 4:21
"Cette Chanson Est Pour Vous" (Fred Alhert, Joseph Young) – 4:05
"If You Were Mine" (Matty Malneck, Johnny Mercer) – 3:50
"New Orleans Blues" (Blue Lu Barker) – 3:20
"Embraceable You" (George Gershwin, Ira Gershwin) – 4:19
"J'attendrai" (Dino Olivieri, Louis Poterat, Nino Rastelli) – 4:11

Personnel
Ann Savoy – vocals
Glenn Fields – drums
Eric Frey – upright bass
Chas Justus – guitar
Tom Mitchell – guitar
Kevin Wimmer – fiddle
Production notes:
Ann Savoy – producer, photography
Joel Savoy – producer, engineer, mixing
Brad Blackwood – mastering
Brooke Barnett – cover design
Gabrielle Savoy – photography

References 

2010 albums
Ann Savoy albums